Good News from the Next World is the tenth studio album by Scottish rock band Simple Minds, released in January 1995 by record label Virgin.

The album's recording started in the band's own studio in Perthshire, Scotland, in 1993, and finished in Los Angeles, US, in summer 1994. The two original band members – singer Jim Kerr and guitarist Charlie Burchill – wrote all nine tracks on the album. They were joined by a number of guest musicians for recording sessions. Keith Forsey, who had previously worked with Simple Minds on their breakout single "Don't You (Forget About Me)", shares producing credits with the band.

In some markets the album performed somewhat better than their previous record, Real Life, but it quickly faded from public attention, producing only two moderately successful hit singles.

Commercial performance
The album garnered moderate commercial success. In the UK, it reached number 2 and produced two UK top 20 hits: "She's a River" (number 9) and "Hypnotised" (number 18).

"She's a River", inspired by Herman Hesse's novel Siddhartha, was also a commercial success worldwide, reaching number 3 in Canada, number 6 on the Billboard Album Rock Tracks chart (now the Mainstream Rock chart) and number 52 on the US Billboard Hot 100. It was their first hit in the United States since "See the Lights" in 1991.

"Hypnotised" was less successful globally, though it charted in Australia, Canada, Germany, Ireland and Italy.

Critical reception

Good News from the Next World received favourable reviews among critics in the United States. In the UK, it received mixed reviews. John Harris wrote in Melody Maker that the album "approximates the noise that would be made if the entire contents of a music shop were strapped to an Empire transport ship from Star Wars", adding "for all its cod-Wagnerian vastness, there are no tunes." Good News from the Next World also received a favourable review from Time Out, while Vox gave an unfavourable review.

Track listing

Personnel

Simple Minds
 Jim Kerr – vocals
 Charlie Burchill – guitar, keyboards

Additional musicians
 Mark Browne – bass
 Malcolm Foster – bass
 Marcus Miller – bass
 Lance Morrison – bass
 Mark Schulman – drums
 Tal Bergman – drums
 Vinnie Colaiuta – drums
 Stefani Spruill – backing vocals
 Pat Hodges – backing vocals
 Maxann Lewis – backing vocals
 Julia Walters – backing vocals

Technical
 Keith Forsey – producer
 Simple Minds - producer
 Brian Reeves – recording
 Tom Lord Alge – mixing
 Chris Fogel – assistant engineer
 Sean O'Dwyer – assistant engineer
 Rob Kirwan – assistant engineer
 Gil Morales – assistant engineer
 Kenny Polakovich – assistant engineer
 Doug Cowan – technical direction
 Tony Donald – equipment
 Clive Banks for CBL – worldwide representation
 Alan McBlane – coordination
 Stylorouge – art direction and design
 David Scheinmann – band photography
 Rob O'Conner – textural photography
 Stuar MacKenzie – textural photography

Charts

Weekly charts

Year-end charts

Certifications and sales

References

External links
 

1995 albums
Simple Minds albums
Albums produced by Keith Forsey
Virgin Records albums